Elizabeth Fearn "Finn" Carter is an American former actress. She is best known for her role in the 1990 film Tremors, starring Kevin Bacon and Fred Ward.

Early life
Carter was born in Greenville, Mississippi (U.S.). She is the daughter of Hodding Carter III, a former U.S. Assistant Secretary of State with President  Jimmy Carter’s administration and his second wife Patricia Derian Assistant Secretary of State for Human Rights and Humanitarian Affairs. Her mother is the former Margaret Ainsworth Wolfe. One year at  Skidmore College in Saratoga Springs, New York, and her remaining college years as a theatre student at Tulane University in New Orleans, Louisiana.

Career
Carter began her career in the theatre and was a member of the Circle Repertory Company in New York. She created the role of Effie Herrington at San Diego's Old Globe Theatre in Up In Saratoga, written by Terrence McNally and directed by Jack O'Brien. Her second West Coast theatre appearance was at the Pasadena Playhouse in a revival of Biloxi Blues. At the same time, she began acting on television, playing Sierra Estaban Reyes Montgomery in the CBS daytime soap opera As the World Turns from 1985 to 1988 and in a short reprise in 1994. After leaving daytime TV, she guest-starred in a number of television shows before making her big-screen debut in a starring role in the 1989  romantic comedy film How I Got Into College opposite Anthony Edwards.

In 1990, Carter played Rhonda LeBeck in the comedy monster film Tremors opposite Kevin Bacon and Fred Ward. She received the Saturn Award for Best Supporting Actress nomination for her performance in that film. She later had the recurring role in the ABC drama series China Beach as Nurse Linda Matlock Lanier. In 1992, she played the leading role in the action film Sweet Justice and in 1996 had a supporting part in Rob Reiner's drama Ghosts of Mississippi. The following years, she guest-starred on Law & Order, Murder, She Wrote, Diagnosis: Murder, ER, The Outer Limits, NYPD Blue, Chicago Hope, Judging Amy, Strong Medicine and CSI: Crime Scene Investigation. Carter was also a regular cast member in the short-lived Fox sitcom Secret Service Guy in 1997. She also had a number of leading roles on many made-for-television movies. Her final screen appearance was in the 2005 independent film Halfway Decent, co-starring with Ernie Hudson.

Personal life
Carter was married from 1987 to 1994 to actor Steven Weber, whom she met on the set of As the World Turns when he played the character of Kevin Gibson (from 1985 to 1986). Her second marriage, to James Woodruff (1997–2007), also ended in divorce. She has two daughters from that marriage.

Legal matters
On July 30, 2019, Carter was arrested in Las Vegas, Nevada, and booked on one count of possessing a stolen vehicle and 14 counts of possessing a credit card without the cardholder's consent. Both charges are felonies. Prosecutors have 90 days to file a criminal complaint. Carter was released from custody by a justice of the peace with the promise to return for an October court date.

Filmography

References

External links
 

20th-century American actresses
21st-century American actresses
American film actresses
American soap opera actresses
American television actresses
Living people
People from Greenville, Mississippi
Skidmore College alumni
Tulane University alumni
Year of birth missing (living people)